Rick Jones is an American college baseball coach who most recently served as the head coach of the Tulane Green Wave baseball team.  He held that position for 21 seasons – from 1994 to 2014.

Jones led the Green Wave to 12 NCAA Tournament appearances. In 2001 his team advanced to the College World Series for the first time in school history. In 2005, he again led his team to the CWS, this time as the overall #1 seed in the tournament. Jones' Green Wave teams won four Conference USA regular-season championships (1997, 1998, 2001, 2005) and five Conference USA tournament championships (1996, 1998, 1999, 2001, 2005).

Early in his coaching career, Jones coached at Ferrum College, while it was an NJCAA member and at Elon College, while it was an NAIA member.

Head coaching records

References

Year of birth missing (living people)
Living people
Elon Phoenix baseball coaches
Ferrum Panthers baseball coaches
Georgia Tech Yellow Jackets baseball coaches
Sandhills Flyers baseball players
Tulane Green Wave baseball coaches
UNC Wilmington Seahawks baseball players